WECS (90.1 FM) is a college radio station based in Windham, Connecticut, on the campus of Eastern Connecticut State University.  The station broadcasts on 90.1 MHz with an effective radiated power (ERP) of 430 watts at a height above average terrain (HAAT) of 116 meters.

WECS began in the 1970s as a turntable mounted in a 3x4' square of plywood which sat atop a work sink in a janitor's closet in an old dormitory.  This was not a licensed station.  It ran at approximately 10 watts and was a pirate broadcaster.  At the time, Eastern Connecticut State University  was not yet accredited as a university.   In the late 1970s, a movement was afoot to get a legitimate radio station for the communications department.  This was orchestrated by former WCBS announcer Prof. John Zatowski.

By 1982, test broadcasts had begun, and by 1984, WECS-FM was on air.  In the succeeding decades, a number of long-time DJs have come and gone: Joe Standby, Bash, Robbo Retro, Alf ("The Alternative Xperience"), Mark E. Ramone, Beechnut, James 'DJ Ras J' McGurk, Gabriel Silverman and others.  Marko, Hack, and Jeffrey Nash remain.  Despite the stations relatively minor stature, a good number of its staff have moved on to work in the media industry.

At present, WECS is a National Public Radio affiliate and John Zatowski the general manager. In July 2008, WECS moved into its new air studio.

See also 

 Connecticut Public Radio
 Eastern Connecticut State University
 Campus radio

External links 
 https://web.archive.org/web/20170609172838/http://www.wecsfm.com/schedule/
 

Eastern Connecticut State University
Willimantic, Connecticut
ECS
Windham County, Connecticut
ECS
NPR member stations
Radio stations established in 1982
1982 establishments in Connecticut